Candala may refer to:

 Chandala, a Hindu group
 Qandala, a town in northern Somalia